New Germany is mostly a neighborhood of Beavercreek, in Greene County, Ohio, United States, with small adjacent areas in unincorporated Beavercreek Township.

History
New Germany was not officially platted. A share of the early settlers being natives of Germany most likely caused the name to be selected.

References

Unincorporated communities in Greene County, Ohio
Unincorporated communities in Ohio